Longchaeng is a district of Xaisomboun province, Laos.

History
In November 2015, unrest broke out in the province, killing three soldiers and three civilians. The Lao government imposed a curfew in the north-central part of the province in early-December, but in January 2016 a bomb was set off at a road construction site near Pha Nok Nok village in the district, killing two Chinese officials and injuring another. On 30 December, a bomb had previously been defused at Namphanoy  village along the same road. As a result, on 16 February 2016, Major General Thongloy Silivong, a military officer who is the former chief of the National Defense Academy, was appointed the governor of Xaisomboun Province to tighten control.

References 

Districts of Laos